John McNeill was a municipal politician from Calgary, Alberta, Canada. He served as an Alderman on Calgary City Council from January 6, 1916 to January 2, 1918.

Political career
McNeill was elected to Calgary city council for the first time in the 1916 Calgary municipal election. He was re-elected again in 1917.

While still an Alderman, McNeill ran in the South Calgary provincial electoral district, as a Liberal-Conservative candidate. McNeill was neither endorsed by the Liberals or Conservatives but did not want to run under an Independent banner. He felt that his chances of winning a seat in the provincial legislature were good. McNeill ran on a platform of fiscal conservatism.

He finished third place in the three-way race behind Labor activist William Irvine and incumbent Conservative MLA Thomas Blow. He took 19% of the popular vote in that election.

McNeill did not return to City council in the 1918 Calgary municipal election.

References

Calgary city councillors